Pirmin Franz Strasser (born 16 October 1990) is an Austrian footballer who plays as a goalkeeper for St. Pölten.

Club career
Born in Linz, Strasser began his career with SV Grödig in the second division. In July 2010, his contract expired and he was allowed to leave.

Strasser signed with SV Ried after two months without a club. However, he failed to make an appearance for his new team, and in early January 2011 moved to Spain, joining UD Almería and being assigned to the B-side.

In the 2011–12 season, Strasser was promoted to the Andalusians' main squad as third-choice, after the departure of Diego Alves to Valencia CF. He continued to be exclusively used by the B's in the third level during his spell, however, being released in May 2014.

On 9 May 2014, Strasser returned to his former club Grödig, replacing released Kevin Fend. He made his debut as a professional on 14 March of the following year, coming on as a substitute for injured Cican Stankovic in a 0–4 away loss against SK Rapid Wien.

On 7 January 2021, he joined St. Pölten.

International career
Strasser played for Austria's under-19 team in the 2009 UEFA European Championship elite qualification, against Finland. He later appeared in two friendlies with the under-21s, against Hungary and Portugal.

References

External links

1990 births
Living people
Footballers from Linz
Austrian footballers
Association football goalkeepers
Austrian Football Bundesliga players
2. Liga (Austria) players
FC Juniors OÖ players
SV Grödig players
SV Ried players
Segunda División B players
UD Almería B players
New Zealand Football Championship players
Waitakere United players
SKN St. Pölten players
Austria youth international footballers
Austria under-21 international footballers
Austrian expatriate footballers
Expatriate footballers in Spain
Expatriate association footballers in New Zealand
Austrian expatriate sportspeople in Spain